A is a 1998 Indian-Kannada romantic psychological thriller film written and directed by Upendra. It starred Upendra and Chandini as the lead couple. It tells the love story between a film director and an actress which is narrated through multiple flashbacks within flashbacks and reverse screenplay. The film deals with dark truths of the film world like the casting couch. Due to the reverse screenplay, some audience members watched it multiple times to understand the story. The movie was an instant cult hit.

The opening sequence of the movie where a misanthropic man who is exhilarated by the sense of power he receives by carrying a revolver while walking on the streets was reported to be based on Jean-Paul Sartre's short story Erostratus found in his 1939 collection of short stories  The Wall.

Upon release, A collected more than  20 crores at the box office. The movie was dubbed into Telugu and released in Andhra Pradesh. The film was remade in Tamil as Adavadi. It was Gurukiran's first film as a music director. Upendra won the Udaya Film Award for Best Male Actor (1998) and Gurukiran won the Udaya Film Award for Best Music Director (1998).

Plot
A foreign woman, Marina, wants to distribute the unreleased controversial film A directed by Soorya. However, the censor board permits only twenty random minutes to be screened, and the climax is censored to such an extent that it no longer made any sense. She suggests its producers re-shoot the film. However, Soorya is not able to participate in the film's shoot as he became a drunkard after actress Chandini, who debuted with his film, rejects his love. Soorya's family is unable to meet their ends after he stops directing films. Lost in her thoughts, he wanders near her house every night drunk, only to be expelled by her henchmen.

Chandini, unable to bear Soorya's torture, asks him to jump from a building to prove his love. Soorya jumps without hesitation. While he survived the fall, he is badly wounded and admitted to the hospital by Marina and the team. There, one of Soorya's former assistant directors explains Soorya's past to Marina. Soorya was a successful director who had no feelings, especially for a woman's love. After his current female lead fails to act properly, he casts Chandini after a chain of events. Initially, Soorya rejects Chandini's love, but after frequent run-ins and days of pursuit, Soorya falls in love with her madly. He later meets a rich and busy Chandini, who lives in a big bungalow and as the mistress of a wealthy married businessman. She defends herself, saying that Soorya's views on the materialistic world influenced her to prioritize money over everything else after her father's death. He tries to explain to her that she is wrong but is expelled.

Since then, Soorya gave up everything and became an alcoholic, wandering near her house every day, hoping that she would accept him. He escapes from the hospital and is confronted by Marina, to whom Soorya explains his love for Chandini. He then saves a novice actress named Archana from a group of henchmen who are revealed to be Chandini's. Archana reveals Chandini was used as bait by the politicians to trap Soorya and stop his A from release. Chandini, in turn, exploited the weakness of those politicians by way of the casting couch. She proves this to Soorya, who, along with his father and Archana, is arrested on charges of prostitution. The police were bribed by Chandini, who abducts Archana while Soorya and his father are arrested.

Soorya and his father are released on bail by Marina, and his family's plight makes Soorya swear revenge. He restarts the shoot of A and turns out to be a superstar due to the films' success starring him. The climax shoot is pending, and Soorya wants to shoot it realistically, which is the murder of Chandini in a burning house. The camera rolls and Soorya kidnaps Chandini from her hen house where women are prostituted to influential politicians and people in business, where she kills the businessman she was engaged to. He brings her to the location and sets it on fire after rolling the camera. She knocks him out, who falls unconscious after hitting a rock. Archana, Marina, and the producers come to the spot to save him.

Archana shows him the film footage that was shot after revealing that Chandini is a good woman who wanted to bring Soorya back to normal by acting as a ruthless criminal who is destroying many actresses' lives like Archana. The footage shows a naked Chandini dying and revealing the truth. She says that the businessman was a friend of few corrupt politicians who wanted to have sex with her. They killed her father and raped her and her minor sister. The businessman blackmails Chandini with a tape that captured the brutal rape. As per their directions, she had to cheat Soorya. But with the help of Archana, she brings him back to normal and gives A a perfect ending. Soorya tries to save her by entering the house, but she dies, asking him to live long and make films that expose the demons that haunt society.

Cast
 Upendra as Surya
 Chandini
 Archana
 Marina
 Kote Prabhakar as Film producer
 Biradar
 Malathi
 Suchitra as Surya's sister
 Saroja Srishailan as Surya's mother
 Michael Madhu as Michael
 Mandapanda Aiyappa as Businessman Teja
 Tumkur Mohan
 Suresh Babu
 Gurukiran as Actor
 Shankar Bhat
 Sriraj Kothari
 Balu Murugaraj
 M.V.Joshi
 Raghunath
 Roopa Iyer
 Bhushan Geechi
 Narendra Babu
 Vijaya Sarathi
 Damu
 Puttaraju

Production
Upendra and three others B. G. Manjunath, B. Jagannath, and B. V. Ramakrishna, founded the film production company Uppi Entertainers in October 1996, with the equal partnership. After Kannada film distributors refused to purchase the distribution rights following the producers themselves not being confident of the film doing well, it was purchased by a newcomer by the name Yash Raj. This was Upendra's debut film as a lead actor.

Release

The film was given an U (Universal) certification from CBFC.

Box-office response
A was made at 1.25 crore and collected more than 20 crore at the box office. The film ran for 25 weeks in Karnataka and its Telugu version ran for 100 days in Andhra Pradesh.

Critical reception
It was described by a reviewer as "loud and disjointed, like the ramblings of a delirious mind, but made a lot of sense". Its design received some praise. The dialogues provoked controversy, due to their misogynistic and philosological nature. They also contained autobiographical elements.

Influences

In an interview given to the Times of India on 24 May 2020, Malayalam director Lijo Jose Pellissery who is famous for  nonlinear storylines and aestheticization of violence picked this movie as one of the five Indian movies which have managed to influence him at different levels.

Soundtrack

Gurukiran composed the music for the film and the soundtracks which marked his debut. The album has five soundtracks. The daughter-in-law of Kannada poet G.P. Rajarathnam alleged that a song by the late poet, "Helkollakondooru thalemyagondhsooru," for which she held the copyright, had been used by Upendra in the film without her consent. Deva, the music director of the Tamil version, retained two songs from this movie - "Idhu One Day" was retained as "Idhu One Day" and "Sum Sumne" was retained as "En Anbea".

Awards
 Udaya Film Award for Best Male Actor – Upendra
 Udaya Film Award for Best Music Director – Gurukiran
 Karnataka State Film Award for Best Sound Recording – Murali Rayasam
 Karnataka State Film Award for Best Editor – T. Shashikumar

References

External links
 

Films set in Bangalore
1998 films
1990s Kannada-language films
1990s psychological thriller films
Films about filmmaking
Films scored by Gurukiran
Kannada films remade in other languages
Indian nonlinear narrative films
Films directed by Upendra
Indian psychological thriller films